The Australian Writers' Guild (AWG) is the professional association for Australian performance writers for film, television, radio, theatre, video and new media. The AWG was established in 1962.  The AWG is a member of the Australian Council of Trade Unions.

The AWG gives writers a political voice by lobbying government on such issues as copyright protection and the provision of support for film and theatre funding bodies and the ABC and protecting Australian content. The AWG is a democratic organisation run by its members, who each year elect a National Executive Council and State Branch Committees.

The Australian Writers' Guild receives assistance from the Literature Fund of the Australia Council, the State Arts Ministries in New South Wales and Western Australia, the Australian Film Commission, the Film Finance Corporation, Cinemedia, the South Australian Film Corporation, Pacific Film and Television, Screenwest and the NSW Film and Television office.

Since 1967, the AWG confers the AWGIE Awards for excellence in screen, television, stage and radio writing.

The Australian Writers' Guild is a professional association that has been representing Australian screenwriters, playwrights, radio writers, comedy writers and digital media writers since 1962. The Guild aims to promote the Australian Cultural voice within the arts. It was created for writers by writers, with the council consisting of members within their respective performative industries.

The guild recognises through their mission statement that performance writing and performance writers ‘thrive as a dynamic and integral part of Australian storytelling, shaping, reflecting and enhancing the Australian cultural voice in all its diversity.’ This is exemplified through the Guild's work as a political voice through lobbying the Australian government on issues such as funding and copyright protection in order to protect Australian content.
In regards to leadership, the AWG is a democratically run association, run by the members of the guild. Each year, the members elect the National-Executive Council alongside Branch Committees that represent each Australian state. Membership is an essential aspect of the Guild as they dictate the leadership, action and fund distribution of the association.
Shane Brennan is the current president of the National Executive Committee. He was elected in 2019. Brennan is an Australian writer and producer, working on the US television drama NCIS, which is currently on its fifteenth season.

In 1967 the AWG introduced the AWGIE awards. This annual awards ceremony is judged by over 50 writers apart of the Guild, awarding excellence in screen, stage and radio writing.

As of 2019, The Australian Writers Guild is supported financially by the Australian Film Commission, Screen Australia, Scripted Ink. , The Film Finance Corporation, Screenwest, Screen NSW, Screenrights, Media Super and the South Australian Film Corporation. The AWG also receives assistance from the Literature Fund of the Australian Council.

History
The Guild was founded in March 1962 when a group of 17 radio writers met at the Australia Hotel in Sydney and decided to form a guild to represent their professional interests. It was originally called The Australian Radio, Television and Screenwriters' Guild. Founded on the notions of misrepresentation within Australian society, exceptional underfunding and poor professional treatment, the AWG aimed to aid in these areas. The early 60s also saw an influx of imported media from predominantly the United States and England to Australian Television. This left minimal room for the local market and severely impacted the state of the Australian Media industry. A pivotal moment in societal advancement in switching from predominantly focused radio entertainment to the television, the founders of the guild were determined to ensure Australia was not left behind.
The first interim committee comprised Don Houghton, Richard Lane, Ric Aspinall, Kay Keaveney and Lyle Martin.

Nearing the end of 1962, the Australian Writers Guild was officially registered as a Trade Union in New South Wales. This was seen as important because it provided recognition and support from other trade unions within the industry, notably Actors' Equity and the Musicians' Union.

1963 saw the AWG's first industrial dispute over an Australian network offering an unacceptable amount for a script written by Eleanor Witcombe.  To quote Gillian Armstrong, a major Australian film director, 'Eleanor was not a self-promoter. She was proud and passionate and dedicated, and truly a great writer'. The Guild's deal encompassed both the entity itself and all reserved rights. Members stood against this cementing the Guilds power within the industry. The dispute was appropriately managed and the writer was appropriately paid. This became the Guild's first successful case in fighting for creators rights.

1967 saw the Guild's introduction of the AWGIE award. These were presented to performance writers who demonstrated exceptional work within their respective fields. Created by the members, these now esteemed Australian awards aim to recognise and reward excellence in an extensive list of categories. The first AWGIE awards night dinner took place at the Wentworth Hotel in Sydney Australia. In attendance were several esteemed guests such as the Prime Minister of the time, John Gorton.

By 1968, the Guild was in negotiations with the ABC tackling performative writers rights once again. At this time, fees for scripts were at an extraordinary low. As a result of this, the AWG united with the Council of the Society of Authors and Actors’ Equity in an attempt to resolve tensions between the ABC's treatment of its creators. The ABC eventually found an agreement to the Guild's terms of worker equity and signed off on the standard contract by the early 70s.

Lance Peters was the Guild's president at the turn of the decade. He initiated a library of professional scripts available for guild members. His leadership brought in the inclusion of legal advisors to assist with safeguard copywriter and contract negotiation. Victorian Guild members began lobbying for further autonomy in their own ran programs through the AWG. This threatened the Guilds status as a Trade Union in NSW, so the association was split into fully operative state branches as determined at the annual Federal Conference involving all members. Peters thus began to lobby against networks threatening the worker's rights of many performance writers. Emerging from this came the “Make it Australian” campaign in which other writing industry guilds united in support of keeping performative media in Australia amongst Australian creators. Peters's involvement here truly marked the AWG's involvement in “political and industrial issues such as moral rights and copyright protection, censorship, taxation and broadcasting legislation”.

1972, the tenth anniversary of the AWG's founding and Peters utilized this milestone  to broaden the Guilds affiliations with "the Australian film commission, the Playwrights’ Conference, the “Make it Australian” Committee, the Children's Film Council, the ASA, and the Copyright Council".

Later 1973 saw the guild join the Film Action Committee in order to raise media attention against visiting Jack Valenti in the US due to his ideology towards copyright. Through to 1979, the Guild was heavily influential in the fight for performance workers rights. Australian production houses were delaying their signing of an Industry-Wide agreement to produce a standard contract that saw for writers enforced rights and fair pay. Interim Industrial Officer Roger Simpson was responsible for overseeing this aspect of the Guilds work. David Wilson overtakes Peters as the president of the guild.
1980 saw the strike against Channel 9's pay towards its writers to be one of the Guilds longest and most successful campaigns. This resulted in the network paying its workers A$250 dollars per hour of script as opposed to the A$60 originally being received. The strike lasted six months, from November 1980 to March 1981.

Throughout the 1980s, Australian performance industries were suffering from funding cuts. Tax concessions were the major focus of the Guild. Wilson sought for further government funding to help greater support the local film and television industries, offering that five out of the seven production projects taking place in Australia should be Australian written. Wilson signed off on this notion with the support of other unions to increase the appeal of local creators strengthening the local industry.

Approaching the end of the 1980s, the Australian Film Committee was in close contact with the Guild, strengthening the claims and actions taken by its members. United, the unions continued to campaign against low residual fees in performative writing contracts. 1988 saw the appointment of New Guild president Geoffrey Atherden, A Sydney University graduate infamous in his comedic screenwriting (particularly for his co-writing credits in The Aunty Jack Show). Angela Wales is later appointed as the first executive officer, in this role she was in close discussion with the AFC.

As the 1990s came in turn, the AWG had grown to have approximately 850 members and a similar amount of associates. With offices in Sydney and Melbourne and chapters in every other state, the guild had established itself as a powerful force within the performative writing world, standing firmly for workers writers in the film, television, radio and theatre industries across Australia. 1996 saw the guilds first real push for involvement in the Theatre industry in Australia. Negotiating the Theatre Industry Agreement, writers received minimum rates and commissioning rights for each piece crafted for the stage. This also involved that writers would share in box office receipts, 10% to each ticket sold, in which is internationally recognised as one of the highest rates in the world.

Late 1990s, between 1997 and 1999, AWG lobbied to ensure legislation encompassing moral rights and copyright rights for Australian creators.
The Copyright Amendment (Moral Rights) Act was passed in December 2000. This protected Australian writers intellectual property and furthered the ramifications for breaking authorship integrity and workplace morality. https://www.legislation.gov.au/Details/C2004A00752. The guild was heavily involved in this essential legislation .
IN 2004, the guild partnered with The Sun-Herald and The Sydney Morning Herald to organize the What Matters? writing competition.

In 2009, the guild quit Australian Screen Council over a financial disagreement.

For many years, the executive director of the organization has been Jacqueline Woodman (now Jacqueline Elaine). In January 2019 Shane Brennan replaced Jan Sardi as president.

The Australian Performative Writing Industry
The initiatives and the services of the AWG service the individual members of the Guild whilst aiming to enhance the Australian Performative Writing Industry as a whole. Applying the mission statement, seeing, “Performance writing and performance writers thrive as a dynamic and integral part of Australian storytelling; shaping, reflecting and enhancing Australia’s cultural voice in all its diversity.” In many instances, the AWG acts as the national voice of performance writers, seeking federal and state support to recognise performance writing within the Australian culture of storytelling.

2020 saw the impact of COVID-19 within the AWG. The Guild worked in conjunction with Screen Australia to monitor the screen industries response to the unprecedented upheaval of the times. According to MediaWeek, one million Australian dollars was donated by Netflix to support the launch of the COVID-19 Film and TV Emergency Relief Fund in order to best support production shutdowns in Australian. AWG is currently (as of June 2020) enabling the distribution of these funds to the hardest-hit workers.

Pathways

Pathways is an AWG program developed by members for its members that showcases exemplar scripts in order to gain exposure to industry professionals in their respective fields. This gateway program enables members to have their works published and produced within the Australian industry, essentially jumpstarting networking opportunities and careers.

Founded in 2010, the Pathways showcase has enabled Australian writers to gain exposure. Over 30 Australian projects have been funded by Scripted Ink. for further script development and even production. Scripts by guild members are showcased on the website. This is essentially free exposure for writers.

Pathways Prime consists of the works of some of Australia's most successful screenwriters inclusive of Keith Thompson's The Sapphires, Sam Caroll's H2O: Just Add Water and McLeod's Daughters, and Sarah Smith's The Killing Field, among many other successful writers.

AWG Membership
The function of the Australian Writers Guild is reliant on the membership structure of the association. There are a variety of tears of membership, and the accompanying fee paid by each member enables the Guild to create opportunities for its affiliates. The levels of membership are put in place to help differentiate the capabilities of each member within their field.

Full membership entails that the affiliate has a published or produced performance piece to their name. In order to qualify, the piece must be over 50 minutes long except a Television episode can be up to 45 minutes in length. The benefits of this membership include access to model contracts, recommended rates in the industries, industrial advice, networking opportunities, entry to AWG competitions, access to professional development seminars, Opportunities to Pathways and discounted prices on the industry-standard software among other elements.

Associated Membership eligibility is available for non published writers. These are the emerging writers that are looking for opportunity and networking in order to become a part of the writing community. This package includes stand access to agreements of co-writing and employment contracts, eligibility in writing competitions, access to industry events, professional resources, Pathways opportunities, AWG registration and assessment and discounted final draft software among other elements.

Student membership is eligible for any student enrolled in a part or full-time course in performance writing. The benefits of this membership are intended to aid in the development of the student's study. The package includes access to agreements and industry rates, accesses to standard industry agreements, invitations to industry and committee events, professional resource access, AWG script registration and assessment services among other elements.

Each membership can lead into a Lifetime membership of which 28 members currently hold. This is obtained over years of industry successes both in production and accolades.

External links

Official website
Pathways website
AWG membership

References

Trade unions in Australia
International Affiliation of Writers Guilds
Scriptwriters' trade unions
Australian writers' organisations

Trade unions established in 1962
1962 establishments in Australia
Guilds in Australia
Australian screenwriters
Australian women screenwriters
Australian dramatists and playwrights